Moelleriopsis carinaspira is an extinct species of sea snail, a marine gastropod mollusk, unassigned in the superfamily Seguenzioidea.

Description
The length of the shell attains 2 mm.

Distribution
This species occurs in France.

References

 Lozouet, P., 1999. Nouvelles espèces de gastéropodes (Mollusca: Gastropoda) de l'Oligocène et du Miocène inférieur d'Aquitaine (sud-ouest de la France). Partie 2. Cossmanniana 6(1-2): 1-68

carinaspira